Johannes Neumann (born 5 November 1985) is a German breaststroke swimmer who won a gold medal in the 4×50 m medley relay at the European Short Course Swimming Championships 2006, setting a new world record.

References

External links
 
 Johannes Neumann. schwimmen.dsv.de

1985 births
Living people
German male breaststroke swimmers
Swimmers from Leipzig
21st-century German people